Kolah Dul (also Romanized as Kolāh Dūl; also known as Kolāhvel) is a village in Buin Rural District, Nanur District, Baneh County, Kurdistan Province, Iran. At the 2006 census, its population was 75, in 15 families. The village is populated by Kurds.

References 

Towns and villages in Baneh County